Anthony Hanna Berlant (born 1941) is an American artist who was born in New York City.  He attended the University of California, Los Angeles, where he received a BA (1961) and MA (1962) in painting and an MFA (1963) in sculpture.  He has a large collection of Southwestern Native American art, especially Mimbres pottery and Navajo rugs.  He lives and works in Santa Monica, California.

Work
Berlant became known for his collages of found metal objects.  More recently, he has used tin of his own manufacture, gaining control over the color.

Mimbres pottery collection
Berlant was a founding member of the Mimbres Foundation, a Los Angeles-based archaeological conservancy attempting to protect vulnerable Mimbres sites. The Mimbres Foundation also assembled the first photographic archive of all known Mimbres figurative pottery. This archive is currently maintained by the University of New Mexico. Parts of the archive are available online.

Berlant worked with archaeologist Steven A. LeBlanc and others in attempts to attribute Mimbres painted pottery to specific (but still anonymous) Native artists. Berlant and LeBlanc found that (in their opinions) a relatively small number of Mimbres artists made the majority of the ancient pottery, perhaps as few as 2 or 3 artists per village at any given time. Berlant identified one prolific artist he called the "Rabbit Master," who painted rabbits in Figure-ground reversal. Examples are given in a later paper by Russell and Hegmon, which gives examples and photos of other ancient Mimbreño artists' work.

Collections
Art Institute of Chicago
Hirshhorn Museum and Sculpture Garden (Washington, D.C.) 
Honolulu Museum of Art
Iris & B. Gerald Cantor Center for Visual Arts (Stanford, California)
Long Beach Museum of Art (Long Beach, California
Los Angeles County Museum of Art
Minneapolis Institute of Art
Museum of Contemporary Art, Los Angeles
Museum of Contemporary Art San Diego
Oakland Museum of California (Oakland, California)
Orange County Museum of Art (Newport Beach, California)
Palm Springs Art Museum (Palm Springs, California)
Philadelphia Museum of Art
Sheldon Museum of Art (Lincoln, Nebraska)
Whitney Museum of American Art (New York City) 
Wichita Art Museum (Wichita, Kansas)

Personal life
Berlant is Jewish. He met performer, Helen Méndez, in a party in Detroit, in the 1970s, ten years later they met again in Los Angeles, and he recognized her immediately, the two married in 1985.  Their daughter is Kate Berlant.

References

 Brody, J. J. et al., Mimbres Pottery Ancient Art of the American Southwest with introduction by Tony Berlant, Hudson Hills Press,  New York, 1983 
 Clothier, Peter, Tony Berlant: Recent Work 1982-1987, Los Angeles Municipal Art Gallery, 1987 
 Fourcade, Xavier, Tony Berlant New Work 1985-1986, publisher: Xavier Fourcade, 1986
 Fujinami, Josine & Niriko Fujinami, Individual Realities In The California Art Scene Exhibition, Sezon Museum of Art, Tokyo, May 11 - June 10, 1991 Text in English and Japanese Artists in the exhibit: Peter Alexander, Carlos Almarez, Tony Berlant, Laurie Brown, Suzanne Caporae Ianco-Starreles, Sezon Museum of Art, Tokyo, 1991
 Holstein, Jonathan & Robert MacDonald, Artist's Quilts: Quilts by ten contemporary artists in collaboration with Ludy Strauss. Peter Alexander / Charles Arnoldi / Tony Berlant / Ron Cooper / Guy Dill / Laddie John Dill / Claire Falkenstein / Charles Garabedian / Craig Kauffman / Ken Price, La Jolla Museum of Contemporary Art, 1981
 Honolulu Museum of Art, Spalding House: Self-guided Tour, Sculpture Garden, 2014, p. 2.
 L A Louver Gallery, Tony Berlant: Recent Work, L.A. Louver, Los Angeles, 1988
 L A Louver Gallery, Tony Berlant New Work 1990-93, L A Louver, 1993
 Paul, Stella & Cheryl A. Brutvan, Tony Berlant: Recent Work, Contemporary Arts Museum, Houston, Texas, 1982
 Plake, Tony, Katherine Plake & Hough Berlant, Navajo Blankets from the Collection of Tony Berlant, Palm Springs Desert Museum, 1991
 Plous, Phyllis,  Sculptural Perspectives : An Exhin=bition of Small Sculptures of the 70s. Joel Shapiro - Judy Pfaff - Don Johnson - Tony Berlant - Thomas Bang, University of California, Santa Barbara, 1979
 Sachs, Sid, An Inside Place; Interior Spaces of the Mind and Ey By Tony Berlant, Robert Bingham, March Hermansader, Jane Irish, Jess, Irving Perlin, H. C. Westermann, Noyes Museum, Oceanville NJ, 1985
 Whitney Museum of American Art, Tony Berlant: The Marriage of New York and Athens, Whitney Museum of American Art, New York, 1974

Footnotes

American sculptors
Modern sculptors
1941 births
Living people
UCLA School of the Arts and Architecture alumni
Jewish American artists
21st-century American Jews